Hugh Baillie (October 23, 1890 – March 1, 1966) was an American journalist best known as the head of UP (United Press Associations), the leading rival to the Associated Press. As president 1935-1955, he was an overall charge of business operations, and dealings with his correspondents and subscribing newspapers. Baillie was the son of a prominent journalist  in New York, and joined UP in 1915 after attending the University of Southern California. He personally interviewed top European leaders in the coming of World War II, including Adolf Hitler, Benito Mussolini, and Neville Chamberlain. He covered the American invasion of Sicily in 1943, and the Belgian campaign in 1944, in which he was wounded.

After the war Baillie continued with his interviews of famous world leaders, such as the heads of Japan, China, and the Soviet Union. Baillie  was a leader in promoting freedom of news dissemination and called in 1944 for an open system of news sources and transmission, and a minimum of government regulation of the news. His proposals were aired at the Geneva Conference on Freedom of Information in 1948, but were blocked by the Soviets and by France. He strongly supported General Douglas MacArthur and his conduct of the Korean War, making sure that his reporters and editors covered it thoroughly. 

At the time of his retirement, UP had 2900 clients in the United States, and 1500 abroad.

Further reading
  Eleonora W. Schoenebaum, ed. Political Profiles: The Truman Years (1978) pp 16–17

Primary sources
 Hugh Baillie. High Tension: The Recollections of Hugh Baillie (Harper, 1959)

1890 births
1966 deaths
United Press International people
American war correspondents of World War II
American male journalists
20th-century American journalists
Freedom of the press
Place of birth missing
Place of death missing